Oatley is an electoral district of the Legislative Assembly in the Australian state of New South Wales in Sydney's St George district. It is currently held by Mark Coure of the Liberal Party.

Oatley includes the suburbs of Connells Point, Hurstville Grove, Kyle Bay, Lugarno, Mortdale, Oatley, Peakhurst, Peakhurst Heights and parts of Beverly Hills, Blakehurst, Hurstville, Narwee, Penshurst, Riverwood and South Hurstville.

History
Oatley was first created in 1927, with the breakup of the multi-member St George. In 1930, it was abolished and largely replaced by Kogarah. It was recreated for the 2007 election largely replacing the abolished district of Georges River.

Members for Oatley

Election results

References

Electoral districts of New South Wales
1927 establishments in Australia
Oately
1930 disestablishments in Australia
Oately
2007 establishments in Australia
Oately